The Friedrichshafen FF.48 was a German two-seat floatplane fighter of the 1910s produced by Flugzeugbau Friedrichshafen.

Development and design
The FF.48, along with the smaller single-seat FF.43, was designed for defence of the floatplane bases, it was a biplane powered by a Maybach Mb.IV inline piston engine. The pilot and observer each had control of one 7.92 mm (.312 in) machine gun. Only three aircraft were built.

Specifications (FF.48)

See also

References

Bibliography

Further reading

1910s German fighter aircraft
Floatplanes
Biplanes
Single-engined tractor aircraft
FF.48
Aircraft first flown in 1917